Hwajeon Station is a station on the Gyeongui-Jungang Line. Korea Aerospace University is located nearby.

External links
 Station information from Korail

Seoul Metropolitan Subway stations
Railway stations opened in 1954
Metro stations in Goyang